Greek New Testament refers to the New Testament in Koine Greek.

It may also refer to the following texts:
 Novum Instrumentum omne
 Textus Receptus, the basis of the King James Bible
 Novum Testamentum Graece, a critical edition of the Greek New Testament

See also
 New Testament manuscript